Dil Diwana is a 1974 Bollywood drama film directed by Narendra Bedi. It starred Randhir Kapoor and Jaya Bhaduri in lead roles. R. D. Burman composed the music for the film.

Cast
Randhir Kapoor as Vijay
Jaya Bhaduri as Neeta 
Aruna Irani as Geeta 
Kader Khan as Advocate
Komal as Sunita 
Kamal Kapoor as Kapoor 
Pinchoo Kapoor as Manager 
Mumtaz Begum as Neeta's Mother
Satyendra Kapoor as Jamal Khan 
Durga Khote as Vijay's Grandmother
Manmohan as Pyarelal 
Paintal as Ratan

Plot
Vijay lives a wealthy lifestyle with his widowed grandmother in a palatial house. He spends all day in bed, and all night in the company of at least one girlfriend. He travels to Kashmir, has an affair with beautiful Gita, spends the night with her, and even poses as her husband. Upon his return to Bombay, he loses his heart to gorgeous Sunita, who also falls in love with him. All this comes to naught, when Sunita finds out that he has a girlfriend in Nita, not knowing that Nita is only employed with Vijay's firm. Nita's positive influence does get Vijay to mend his ways, and he decides to introduce Nita to his grandma so that they can get married. But a surprise awaits Vijay there when Gita arrives from Kashmir along with her brother, Pyarelal and a small child, she claims is Vijay's. Watch what impact this has on Nita and Vijay's grandmother, and on Vijay, who must now get used to being a husband and father.

Soundtrack

External links
 

1974 films
1970s Hindi-language films
1974 drama films
Films directed by Narendra Bedi
Films scored by R. D. Burman
Rose Audio Visuals